The Governing Council (GovCo) was the legislature and executive of Solomon Islands between 1970 and 1974.

History
The Governing Council was established in 1970 when a new constitution was promulgated on 10 April. It combined the previous Legislative Council and Executive Council into a single body. For the first time, elected members were in the majority, having increased in number from 14 to 17. The GovCo consisted of seventeen elected members, nine government officials and the High Commissioner, who served as Chairman.

The Council had six committees; Communications, Finance, Internal Affairs, Natural Resources, Social Services and Works. The elected members were elected from single-member constituencies for four-year terms. The first elections took place in 1970. Prior to the 1973 elections the number of elected members and consistencies was increased to 24.

On  27 August 1974 a new constitution was promulgated, abolishing the Governing Council and replacing it with the Legislative Assembly.

List of constituencies

References

 
Politics of the Solomon Islands
Defunct unicameral legislatures
1970 establishments in the Solomon Islands
1974 disestablishments in the Solomon Islands